Theodore Reade is an American professional wrestler who is known for his short-lived stint in World Championship Wrestling. As of 2013  Reade was working on the independent circuit.

World Championship Wrestling
In 1999 Reade went under the ring name 4x4 and debuted in World Championship Wrestling as a member of Master P's No Limit Soldiers along with BA, Chase Tatum, Konnan, Rey Mysterio, Jr. and Swoll. They later feuded with The West Texas Rednecks due to the Rednecks hatred of rap music. After the soldiers broke up 4x4 changed his name to Cassius by joining a heel stable called Harlem Heat 2000 and acted as a bodyguard, the group, consisting of the leader Stevie Ray, Big T and manager J. Biggs, then began feuding with Booker T. although the feud didn't last long and Harlem Heat 2000 began to split up. Reade's presence would draw attention of the audience simply due to his enormous physical size.

Championships and accomplishments
Northeast Wrestling
Battle Royal winner

Personal life
Has worked as a bodyguard for Mike Tyson, 50 Cent, Winky Wright, Robbie Keane and other celebrities.

References

External links
 Teddy Reade's Profile
 WCW Uncensored 2000: Kidman & Booker T. vs Harlem Heat 2000
 WCW Monday Nitro: Harlem Heat 2000 vs Kidman & Booker T.
 WCW Spring Stampede: Harlem Heat 2000 vs Shane Douglas & Buff Bagwell

African-American male professional wrestlers
American male professional wrestlers
Bodyguards
Living people
Year of birth missing (living people)
21st-century African-American people